Reu or Ragau, according to Genesis in the Hebrew Bible, was the son of Peleg and the father of Serug, thus being Abraham's great-great-grandfather and the ancestor of the Israelites and Ishmaelites.

In scriptures 
The Book of Jubilees names Reu's mother as Lomna of Shinar (10:28), and his wife as Ora, daughter of Ur Kesed (11:1). He is said to have been born at the time when the Tower of Babel was begun.

According to the Masoretic text , Reu was 32 when Serug was born and lived to the age of 239 (when Abraham was either 18 or 78). 

The Septuagint and Samaritan Pentateuch state that his age on fathering Serug was 132, and the Septuagint thus gives age at death as 339.

In popular culture 
The biblical film Abraham (1993) features Nadim Sawalha as a minor character named Reko, whose name is phonetically similar to Reu.

References

Book of Genesis people
Book of Jubilees